

Events

Pre-1600
 456 – Ricimer defeats Avitus at Piacenza and becomes master of the Western Roman Empire.
 690 – Empress Wu Zetian ascends to the throne of the Tang dynasty and proclaims herself ruler of the Chinese Empire.
 912 – Abd ar-Rahman III becomes the eighth Emir of Córdoba.
 955 – King Otto I defeats a Slavic revolt in what is now Mecklenburg-Vorpommern.
1311 – The Council of Vienne convenes for the first time.
1384 – Jadwiga is crowned King of Poland, although she is a woman.
1590 – Prince Gesualdo of Venosa murders his wife and her lover.

1601–1900
1736 – Mathematician William Whiston's predicted comet fails to strike the Earth.
1780 – American Revolutionary War: The British-led Royalton raid is the last Native American raid on New England.
  1780   – The Great Hurricane of 1780 finishes after its sixth day, killing between 20,000 and 24,000 residents of the Lesser Antilles.
1793 – French Revolution: Queen Marie Antoinette is executed.
  1793   – War of the First Coalition: French victory at the Battle of Wattignies forces Austria to raise the siege of Maubeuge.
1805 – War of the Third Coalition: Napoleon surrounds the Austrian army at Ulm.
1813 – The Sixth Coalition attacks Napoleon in the three-day Battle of Leipzig.
1817 – Simón Bolívar sentences Manuel Piar to death for challenging the racial-caste in Venezuela.
1834 – Much of the ancient structure of the Palace of Westminster in London burns to the ground.
1836 – Great Trek: Afrikaner voortrekkers repulse a Matabele attack, but lose their livestock.
1841 – Queen's University is founded in the Province of Canada.
1843 – William Rowan Hamilton invents quaternions, a three-dimensional system of complex numbers.
1846 – William T. G. Morton administers ether anesthesia during a surgical operation.
1847 – The novel Jane Eyre is published in London.
1859 – John Brown leads a raid on Harpers Ferry, Virginia.
1869 – The Cardiff Giant, one of the most famous American hoaxes, is "discovered".
  1869   – Girton College, Cambridge is founded, becoming England's first residential college for women.
1875 – Brigham Young University is founded in Provo, Utah.
1882 – The Nickel Plate Railroad opens for business.

1901–present
1905 – The Partition of Bengal in India takes place.
1909 – William Howard Taft and Porfirio Díaz hold the first summit between a U.S. and a Mexican president. They narrowly escape assassination.
1916 – Margaret Sanger opens the first family planning clinic in the United States.
1919 – Adolf Hitler delivers his first public address at a meeting of the German Workers' Party.
1923 – The Walt Disney Company is founded.
1934 – Chinese Communists begin the Long March to escape Nationalist encirclement.
1939 – World War II: No. 603 Squadron RAF intercepts the first Luftwaffe raid on Britain.
1940 – Holocaust in Poland: The Warsaw Ghetto is established.
1943 – Holocaust in Italy: Raid of the Ghetto of Rome.
1946 – Nuremberg trials: Ten defendants found guilty by the International Military Tribunal are executed by hanging.
1947 – The Philippines takes over the administration of the Turtle Islands and the Mangsee Islands from the United Kingdom.
1949 – The Greek Communist Party announces a "temporary cease-fire", thus ending the Greek Civil War.
1951 – The first Prime Minister of Pakistan, Liaquat Ali Khan, is assassinated in Rawalpindi.
1953 – Cuban revolutionary Fidel Castro delivers his "History Will Absolve Me" speech, and is sentenced to 15 years' imprisonment by the Fulgencio Batista government for leading an attack on the Moncada Barracks.
1962 – Cuban Missile Crisis begins: U.S. President John F. Kennedy is informed of photos taken on October 14 by a U-2 showing nuclear missiles (the crisis will last for 13 days starting from this point).
1964 – China detonates its first nuclear weapon.
  1964   – Leonid Brezhnev becomes leader of the Soviet Communist Party, while Alexei Kosygin becomes the head of government.
1968 – Tommie Smith and John Carlos are ejected from the US Olympic team for participating in the Olympics Black Power salute.
  1968   – Kingston, Jamaica is rocked by the Rodney riots, inspired by the barring of Walter Rodney from the country.
  1968   – Yasunari Kawabata becomes the first Japanese person to be awarded the Nobel Prize in Literature.
1970 – Canadian Prime Minister Pierre Trudeau invokes the War Measures Act during the October Crisis.
1973 – Henry Kissinger and Lê Đức Thọ are awarded the Nobel Peace Prize.
1975 – Indonesian troops kill the Balibo Five, a group of Australian journalists, in Portuguese Timor.
  1975   – Three-year-old Rahima Banu, from Bangladesh, is the last known case of naturally occurring smallpox.
  1975   – The Australian Coalition sparks a constitutional crisis when they vote to defer funding for the government's annual budget.
1978 – Pope John Paul II becomes the first non-Italian pontiff since 1523.
1984 – Desmond Tutu is awarded the Nobel Peace Prize.
1985 – The Finnish dry cargo ship MS Hanna-Marjut, on its way from Mariehamn to Naantali, sank in hard sea on the open water of Kihti between the Kökar and Sottunga islands of Åland, leading to the drowning of four people.
1991 – George Hennard runs amok in Killeen, Texas, killing 23 and wounding 20.
1995 – The Million Man March takes place in Washington, D.C. About 837,000 attend.
  1995   – The Skye Bridge in Scotland is opened.
1996 – Eighty-four football fans die and 180 are injured in a massive crush at a match in Guatemala City.
1998 – Former Chilean dictator Augusto Pinochet is arrested in London on a murder extradition warrant.
2002 – The Bibliotheca Alexandrina opens in Egypt, commemorating the ancient library of Alexandria.
2013 – Lao Airlines Flight 301 crashes on approach to Pakse International Airport in Laos, killing 49 people.
2017 – Storm Ophelia strikes the U.K. and Ireland causing major damage and power loss.

Births

Pre-1600
1351 – Gian Galeazzo Visconti, first Duke of Milan (d. 1402)
1396 – William de la Pole, 1st Duke of Suffolk, English admiral (d. 1450) 
1430 – James II of Scotland (d. 1460)
1483 – Gasparo Contarini, Italian cardinal and diplomat (d. 1542)
1535 – Niwa Nagahide, Japanese samurai (d. 1585)
1588 – Luke Wadding, Irish Franciscan friar and historian (d. 1657)

1601–1900
1605 – Charles Coypeau d'Assoucy, French writer and composer (d. 1677)
1620 – Pierre Paul Puget, French painter and sculptor (d. 1694) 
1678 – Anna Waser, Swiss painter (d. 1714)
1679 – Jan Dismas Zelenka, Czech viol player and composer (d. 1745)
1710 – András Hadik, Austrian-Hungarian field marshal (d. 1790) 
1714 – Giovanni Arduino, Italian geologist and academic (d. 1795)
1726 – Daniel Chodowiecki, Polish-German painter and educator (d. 1801) 
1729 – Pierre van Maldere, Belgian violinist and composer (d. 1768)
1752 – Johann Gottfried Eichhorn, German theologian and academic (d. 1827) 
1754 – Morgan Lewis, American general, lawyer, and politician, 3rd Governor of New York (d. 1844) 
1758 – Noah Webster, American lexicographer (d. 1843) 
1762 – Paul Hamilton, American soldier and politician, 3rd United States Secretary of the Navy (d. 1816) 
1789 – William Burton, American physician and politician, 39th Governor of Delaware (d. 1866) 
1795 – William Buell Sprague, American minister, historian, and author (d. 1876)
1802 – Isaac Murphy, American educator and politician, 8th Governor of Arkansas (d. 1882)
1803 – Robert Stephenson, English railway and civil engineer (d. 1859)
1804 – Benjamin Russell, American painter and educator (d. 1885) 
1806 – William P. Fessenden, American lawyer and politician, 26th United States Secretary of the Treasury (d. 1869) 
1815 – Francis Lubbock, American colonel and politician, 9th Governor of Texas (d. 1905)
1818 – William Forster, Indian-Australian politician, 4th Premier of New South Wales (d. 1882)
1819 – Austin F. Pike, American lawyer and politician (d. 1886) 
1831 – Lucy Stanton, American activist (d. 1910)
1832 – Vicente Riva Palacio, Mexican liberal intellectual, novelist (d. 1896)
1840 – Kuroda Kiyotaka, Japanese general and politician, 2nd Prime Minister of Japan (d. 1900)
1841 – Itō Hirobumi, Japanese lawyer and politician, 1st Prime Minister of Japan (d. 1909)
1847 – Maria Pia of Savoy (d. 1911)
1852 – Carl von In der Maur, Governor of Liechtenstein (d. 1913)
1854 – Karl Kautsky, Czech-German journalist, philosopher, and theologian (d. 1938) 
  1854   – Oscar Wilde, Irish playwright, novelist, and poet (d. 1900)
1855 – Samad bey Mehmandarov, Azerbaijani general and politician, 3rd Azerbaijani Minister of Defense (d. 1931) 
1861 – J. B. Bury, Irish historian and scholar (d. 1927) 
  1861   – Richard Sears, American tennis player (d. 1943)
1863 – Austen Chamberlain, English businessman and politician, Chancellor of the Exchequer, Nobel Prize laureate (d. 1937) 
1867 – Mario Ruspoli, 2nd Prince of Poggio Suasa (d. 1963)
1869 – Claude H. Van Tyne, American historian and author (d. 1930)
1872 – Walter Buckmaster, English polo player and businessman, co-founded Buckmaster & Moore (d. 1942)
1876 – Jimmy Sinclair, South African cricketer and rugby player (d. 1913)
1881 – William Orthwein, American swimmer and water polo player (d. 1955) 
1884 – Rembrandt Bugatti, Italian sculptor (d. 1916) 
1886 – David Ben-Gurion, Polish-Israeli soldier and politician, 1st Prime Minister of Israel (d. 1973) 
1888 – Eugene O'Neill, American playwright, Nobel Prize laureate (d. 1953) 
  1888   – Paul Popenoe, American founder of relationship counseling (d. 1979) 
1890 – Michael Collins, Irish general and politician, 2nd Irish Minister for Finance (d. 1922) 
  1890   – Maria Goretti, Italian martyr and saint (d. 1902)
  1890   – Paul Strand, American photographer and director (d. 1975) 
1897 – Louis de Cazenave, French soldier (d. 2008)
1898 – William O. Douglas, American lawyer and jurist (d. 1980) 
1900 – Edward Ardizzone, Vietnamese-English author and illustrator (d. 1979)
  1900   – Primo Conti, Italian painter and poet (d. 1988) 
  1900   – Goose Goslin, American baseball player and manager (d. 1971)

1901–present
1903 – Cecile de Brunhoff, French author and pianist (d. 2003)
  1903   – Big Joe Williams, American Delta blues singer-songwriter and guitarist (d. 1982) 
1904 – Björn Berglund, Swedish actor (d. 1968)
1905 – Ernst Kuzorra, German footballer and manager (d. 1990)
1906 – León Klimovsky, Argentinian actor, director, and screenwriter (d. 1996)
1907 – Richard Titmuss, English sociologist and academic (d. 1973) 
1908 – Olivia Coolidge, English-American author and educator (d. 2006)
  1908   – Enver Hoxha, Albanian general and politician, Prime Minister of Albania (d. 1985) 
1911 – Otto von Bülow, German commander (d. 2006)
1912 – Clifford Hansen, American rancher and politician, 26th Governor of Wyoming (d. 2009) 
1918 – Louis Althusser, Algerian-French philosopher and academic (d. 1990)
  1918   – Abraham Nemeth, American mathematician and academic (d. 2013)
  1918   – Tony Rolt, English race car driver and engineer (d. 2008)
1919 – Kathleen Winsor, American journalist and author (d. 2003)
1920 – Paddy Finucane, Irish fighter pilot and flying ace (d. 1942)
1921 – Matt Batts, American baseball player and coach (d. 2013)
  1921   – Sita Ram Goel, Indian historian, publisher and writer (d. 2003)
  1921   – MacKenzie Miller, American horse trainer and breeder (d. 2010) 
1922 – Max Bygraves, English-Australian actor and singer (d. 2012)
  1922   – Leon Sullivan, American minister and activist (d. 2001) 
1923 – Linda Darnell, American actress (d. 1965)
  1923   – Bert Kaempfert, German conductor and composer (d. 1980) 
  1923   – Bill McLaren, Scottish rugby player and sportscaster (d. 2010)
1924 – Gerard Parkes, Irish-Canadian actor (d. 2014) 
1925 – Daniel J. Evans, American politician, 16th Governor of Washington
  1925   – Angela Lansbury, English-American actress, singer, and producer (d. 2022)
1926 – Charles Dolan, American businessman, founded Cablevision and HBO 
1927 – Günter Grass, German novelist, poet, playwright, Nobel Prize laureate (d. 2015) 
1928 – Mary Daly, American philosopher and theologian (d. 2010)
  1928   – Ann Morgan Guilbert, American actress (d. 2016)
1929 – Fernanda Montenegro, Brazilian actress
1930 – John Polkinghorne, English physicist, theologian and priest (d. 2021)
  1930   – Carmen Sevilla, Spanish actress 
1931 – Charles Colson, American lawyer and politician (d. 2012)
  1931   – Valery Klimov, Ukrainian-Russian violinist and educator (d. 2022)
  1931   – Rosa Rosal, Filipino actress
  1931   – P. W. Underwood, American football player and coach (d. 2013) 
1932 – John Grant, English journalist and politician (d. 2000)
  1932   – Henry Lewis, American bassist and conductor (d. 1996) 
  1932   – Lucien Paiement, Canadian physician and politician (d. 2013)
1933 – Nobuyo Ōyama, Japanese voice actress
1934 – Peter Ashdown, English race car driver 
1936 – Peter Bowles, English actor and screenwriter (d. 2022)
  1936   – Andrei Chikatilo, Ukrainian-Russian serial killer (d. 1994)
  1936   – Mladen Koščak, Croatian footballer (d. 1997) 
  1936   – Akira Machida, Japanese lawyer and judge, 15th Chief Justice of Japan (d. 2015)
1938 – Carl Gunter, Jr., American politician (d. 1999)
  1938   – Nico, German singer-songwriter, model, and actress (d. 1988) 
1940 – Barry Corbin, American actor and producer 
  1940   – Dave DeBusschere, American basketball player and coach (d. 2003)
  1940   – Ivan Della Mea, Italian singer-songwriter, guitarist, and journalist (d. 2009) 
1941 – Tim McCarver, American baseball player and sportscaster (d. 2023)
  1941   – Emma Nicholson, Baroness Nicholson of Winterbourne, English computer programmer and politician
1943 – Fred Turner, Canadian singer-songwriter and bass player 
1944 – Kaizer Motaung, South African footballer and manager 
1945 – Stefan Buczacki, English horticulturalist, botanist, and television host
  1945   – Roger Hawkins, American session drummer (d. 2021)
  1945   – Paul Monette, American author and poet (d. 1995)
1946 – Geoff Barnett, English footballer (d. 2021)
  1946   – Suzanne Somers, American actress and producer
1947 – Nicholas Day, English actor
  1947   – Terry Griffiths, Welsh snooker player and coach 
  1947   – Bob Weir, American singer-songwriter and guitarist
  1947   – David Zucker, American director, producer, and screenwriter
1948 – Alison Chitty, English production designer and costume designer
  1948   – Bruce Fleisher, American golfer (d. 2021)
  1948   – Hema Malini, Indian actress, director, producer, and politician
  1948   – Leo Mazzone, American baseball player and coach 
1950 – Károly Horváth, Romanian-Hungarian cellist, flute player, and composer (d. 2015)
  1950   – Angry Grandpa, American internet personality (d. 2017)
1952 – Christopher Cox, American lawyer and politician 
  1952   – Cordell Mosson, American bass player (d. 2013)
  1952   – Crazy Mohan, Indian actor, screenwriter, and playwright (d. 2019)
  1952   – Glenys Thornton, Baroness Thornton, English politician 
1953 – Tony Carey, American keyboard player, songwriter, and producer
  1953   – Paulo Roberto Falcão, Brazilian footballer and manager
1954 – Lorenzo Carcaterra, American author and blogger 
  1954   – Michael Forsyth, Baron Forsyth of Drumlean, Scottish politician, Secretary of State for Scotland
  1954   – Serafino Ghizzoni, Italian rugby player 
  1954   – Corinna Harfouch, German actress
  1955   – Kieran Doherty, Irish Republican hunger striker and politician (d. 1981)
1955 – Ellen Dolan, American actress
1956 – Marin Alsop, American violinist and conductor 
  1956   – John Chavis, American football player and coach
  1956   – Meg Rosoff, American-English author 
  1956   – Rudra Mohammad Shahidullah, Bangladeshi poet, author, and playwright (d. 1992)
1957 – Priidu Beier, Estonian poet and educator
1958 – Roy McDonough, English footballer and manager
  1958   – Tim Robbins, American actor, director, and screenwriter
1959 – Kevin Brennan, Welsh journalist and politician 
  1959   – Brian Harper, American baseball player
  1959   – Gary Kemp, English singer-songwriter, guitarist, and actor
  1959   – Philip Maini, Northern Irish mathematician at the University of Oxford
  1959   – Tessa Munt, English lawyer and politician
  1959   – Jamie Salmon, English-New Zealand rugby player and sportscaster
  1959   – Erkki-Sven Tüür, Estonian flute player and composer
  1959   – John Whittingdale, English politician
1960 – Guy LeBlanc, Canadian keyboard player and songwriter (d. 2015)
  1960   – Bob Mould, American singer-songwriter, guitarist, and producer 
1961 – Marc Levy, French author 
  1961   – Randy Vasquez, American actor, director, and producer 
  1961   – Scott O'Hara, American pornographic performer, author, poet, editor and publisher (d. 1998)
1962 – Flea, Australian-American bass player, songwriter, and actor
  1962   – Manute Bol, Sudanese-American basketball player and activist (d. 2010)
  1962   – Dmitri Hvorostovsky, Russian opera singer (d. 2017)
  1962   – Nico Lazaridis, German footballer 
  1962   – Tamara McKinney, American skier
1963 – Brendan Kibble, Australian singer-songwriter and guitarist
  1963   – Timothy Leighton, English physicist and academic
1964 – Shawn Little, Canadian lawyer and politician (d. 2012)
  1964   – James Thompson, American-Finnish author (d. 2014) 
1965 – Kang Kyung-ok, South Korean illustrator
  1965   – Tom Tolbert, American basketball player and sportscaster
1966 – Olof Lundh, Swedish journalist
  1966   – Mary Elizabeth McGlynn, American voice actress, singer, and director
1967 – Michael Laffy, Australian footballer 
  1967   – Davina McCall, English television host and actress
1968 – Randall Batinkoff, American actor and producer 
  1968   – Mark Lee, Singaporean actor and singer
  1968   – Francesco Libetta, Italian pianist, composer, and conductor 
  1968   – Todd Stashwick, American actor and writer
  1968   – Elsa Zylberstein, French actress
1969 – Roy Hargrove, American trumpet player and composer (d. 2018)
  1969   – Takao Omori, Japanese wrestler 
  1969   – Terri J. Vaughn, American actress and producer
  1969   – Wendy Wilson, American singer-songwriter
1970 – Kazuyuki Fujita, Japanese wrestler and mixed martial artist 
  1970   – Mehmet Scholl, German footballer and manager
1971 – Chad Gray, American singer-songwriter and guitarist 
  1971   – Paul Sparks, American actor
  1971   – Frank Cuesta, Spanish television presenter
1972 – Adrianne Frost, American comedian, actress, and author 
  1972   – Darius Kasparaitis, Lithuanian-Russian ice hockey player and coach
  1972   – Kordell Stewart, American football player and radio host 
1973 – Justin Credible, American wrestler
  1973   – David Unsworth, English footballer and manager
1974 – Aurela Gaçe, Albanian singer 
  1974   – Paul Kariya, Canadian ice hockey player
1975 – Ernesto Noel Aquino, Honduran footballer
  1975   – Brynjar Gunnarsson, Icelandic footballer
  1975   – Jacques Kallis, South African cricketer 
  1975   – Kellie Martin, American actress, director, and producer 
1977 – John Mayer, American singer-songwriter, guitarist, and producer 
1980 – Sue Bird, Israeli-American basketball player
  1980   – Timana Tahu, Australian rugby league player
1981 – Brea Grant, American actress and writer
  1981   – Martin Halle, Danish footballer
  1981   – Boyd Melson, American boxer
  1981   – Anthony Reyes, American baseball player
1982 – Frédéric Michalak, French rugby player
  1982   – Cristian Riveros, Paraguayan footballer
  1982   – Prithviraj Sukumaran, Indian actor, singer, and producer
1983 – Philipp Kohlschreiber, German tennis player
  1983   – Kenny Omega, Canadian wrestler 
1984 – François Pervis, French track cyclist
  1984   – Rachel Reilly, American talk show host and actress 
1985 – Jay Beagle, Canadian ice hockey player
  1985   – Verena Sailer, German sprinter
  1985   – Casey Stoner, Australian motorcycle racer
  1985   – Peter Wallace, Australian rugby league player
1986 – Nicky Adams, English-Welsh footballer
  1986   – Derk Boerrigter, Dutch footballer
1988 – Zoltán Stieber, Hungarian footballer
1989 – Dan Biggar, Welsh rugby player
1991 – Shardul Thakur, Indian cricketer
1992 – Kostas Fortounis, Greek footballer
  1992   – Bryce Harper, American baseball player
  1992   – Stuart Lightbody, Irish badminton player
  1992   – Viktorija Golubic, Swiss tennis player
1993 – Jovit Baldivino, Filipino singer and actor (d. 2022)
  1993   – Caroline Garcia, French tennis player
1994 – Adam Elliott, Australian rugby league player
1997 – Charles Leclerc, Monégasque Formula One driver
  1997   – Naomi Osaka, Japanese tennis player

Deaths

Pre-1600
 385 – Fú Jiān, Chinese emperor (b. 337)
 786 – Lullus, archbishop of Mainz (b. 710)
 976 – Al-Hakam II, Umayyad caliph (b. 915)
1027 – Fujiwara no Kenshi, Japanese empress (b. 994)
1130 – Pedro González de Lara, Castilian magnate
1284 – Shams al-Din Juvayni, Persian statesman, vizier and minister of finance of the Ilkhanate
1323 – Amadeus V, count of Savoy (b. 1249)
1333 – Nicholas V, antipope of Rome (b. 1260)
1438 – Anne of Gloucester, English noblewoman (b. 1383)
1355 – Louis the Child, king of Sicily (b. 1338)
1523 – Luca Signorelli, Italian painter (b. c.1450)
1553 – Lucas Cranach the Elder, German painter and engraver (b. 1472)
1555 – Hugh Latimer, English bishop and saint (b. 1487)
  1555   – Nicholas Ridley, English bishop and martyr (b. 1500)
1591 – Gregory XIV, pope of the Catholic Church (b. 1535)
1594 – William Allen, English cardinal (b. 1532)

1601–1900
1621 – Jan Pieterszoon Sweelinck, Dutch organist and composer (b. 1562)
1628 – François de Malherbe, French poet and critic (b. 1555)
1637 – Johann Rudolf Stadler, Swiss clock-maker (b. 1605)
1649 – Isaac van Ostade, Dutch painter and illustrator (b. 1621)
1655 – Joseph Solomon Delmedigo, Italian physician, mathematician, and theorist (b. 1591)
1660 – John Cook, English politician, Solicitor General for England and Wales (b. 1608)
1679 – Roger Boyle, 1st Earl of Orrery, Irish-English soldier and politician (b. 1621)
1680 – Raimondo Montecuccoli, Italian-Austrian field marshal (b. 1609)
1730 – Antoine Laumet de La Mothe, sieur de Cadillac, French-American explorer and politician, 3rd French Governor of Louisiana (b. 1658)
  1730   – Nevşehirli Damat Ibrahim Pasha, Greek politician, 139th Grand Vizier of the Ottoman Empire (b. 1666)
1750 – Sylvius Leopold Weiss, German lute player and composer (b. 1687)
1755 – Gerard Majella, Italian saint (b. 1725)
1774 – Robert Fergusson, Scottish poet (b. 1750)
1791 – Grigory Potemkin, Russian general and politician (b. 1739)
1793 – Marie Antoinette, Austrian-born queen consort of Louis XVI of France (b. 1755)
  1793   – John Hunter, Scottish-English surgeon and philosopher (b. 1728)
1796 – Victor Amadeus III of Sardinia (b. 1726)
1799 – Veerapandiya Kattabomman Indian activist (b. 1760)
1810 – Nachman of Breslov, Ukrainian religious leader, founded the Breslov Hasidic group (b. 1772)
1822 – Eva Marie Veigel, Austrian-English dancer (b. 1724)
1877 – Théodore Barrière, French playwright (b. 1823)
1888 – John Wentworth, American journalist and politician, 19th Mayor of Chicago (b. 1815)

1901–present
1904 – Haritina Korotkevich, Russian heroine (b. 1882)
1908 – Joseph Leycester Lyne, English monk (b. 1837)
1909 – Jakub Bart-Ćišinski, German poet and playwright (b. 1856)
1913 – Ralph Rose, American shot putter, discus, and hammer thrower (b. 1885)
1936 – Effie Adelaide Rowlands, British writer (b. 1859)
1937 – Jean de Brunhoff, French poet and playwright (b. 1899)
1946 – Nuremberg trial executions of the Main Trial:
                Hans Frank, German lawyer, politician and war criminal (b. 1900)
                Wilhelm Frick, German lawyer and politician, German Minister of the Interior (b. 1877)
                Alfred Jodl, German general (b. 1890)
                Ernst Kaltenbrunner, Austrian SS officer (b. 1903)
                Wilhelm Keitel, German field marshal (b. 1882)
                Alfred Rosenberg, Estonian architect and politician (b. 1893)
                Fritz Sauckel, German sailor and politician (b. 1894)
                Arthur Seyss-Inquart, Austrian lawyer and politician, 16th Federal Chancellor of Austria (b. 1892)
                Julius Streicher, German journalist and politician (b. 1887)
                Joachim von Ribbentrop, German lieutenant and politician, Minister for Foreign Affairs of Germany (b. 1893)
1947 – Anna B. Eckstein, German peace activist (b. 1868)
1951 – Liaquat Ali Khan, Indian-Pakistani lawyer and politician, 1st Prime Minister of Pakistan (b. 1895)
1956 – Jules Rimet, French businessman (b. 1873)
1957 – John Anthony Sydney Ritson, English rugby player, mines inspector, engineer and educator (b. 1887)
1958 – Robert Redfield, American anthropologist of Mexico (b. 1897)
1959 – Minor Hall, American drummer (b. 1897)
  1959   – George Marshall, American general and politician, 3rd United States Secretary of Defense, Nobel Prize laureate (b. 1880)
1962 – Gaston Bachelard, French poet and philosopher (b. 1884)
1964 – Patsy Callighen, Canadian ice hockey player (b. 1906)
1966 – George O'Hara, American actor and screenwriter (b. 1899)
1968 – Ellis Kinder, American baseball player (b. 1914)
1971 – Robin Boyd, Australian architect and educator, designed the Domain Park Flats (b. 1919)
1972 – Nick Begich, American lawyer and politician (b. 1932)
  1972   – Hale Boggs, American lawyer and politician (b. 1914)
  1972   – Leo G. Carroll, English-American actor (b. 1886)
1973 – Gene Krupa, American drummer, composer, and actor (b. 1909)
1975 – Vittorio Gui, Italian conductor and composer (b. 1885)
1978 – Dan Dailey, American actor, singer, dancer, and director (b. 1913)
1979 – Johan Borgen, Norwegian author and critic (b. 1903)
1981 – Moshe Dayan, Israeli general and politician, 5th Foreign Affairs Minister of Israel (b. 1915)
  1981   – Eugene Eisenmann, Panamanian-American lawyer and ornithologist (b. 1906)
1982 – Mario Del Monaco, Italian tenor (b. 1915)
1983 – Jakov Gotovac, Croatian composer and conductor (b. 1895)
1986 – Arthur Grumiaux, Belgian violinist and pianist (b. 1921)
1989 – Walter Farley, American author and educator (b. 1915)
  1989   – Scott O'Dell, American journalist and author (b. 1898)
  1989   – Cornel Wilde, American actor (b. 1912)
1990 – Art Blakey, American drummer and bandleader (b. 1919)
  1990   – Jorge Bolet, Cuban-American pianist and educator (b. 1914)
1992 – Shirley Booth, American actress and singer (b. 1898)
1996 – Jason Bernard, American actor (b. 1938)
  1996   – Eric Malpass, English author (b. 1910)
1997 – Audra Lindley, American actress (b. 1918)
  1997   – James A. Michener, American author and philanthropist (b. 1907)
1998 – Jon Postel, American computer scientist and academic (b. 1943)
1999 – Jean Shepherd, American radio host, actor, and screenwriter (b. 1921)
2000 – Mel Carnahan, American lieutenant, lawyer, and politician, 51st Governor of Missouri (b. 1934)
  2000   – Rick Jason, American actor (b. 1923)
2001 – Etta Jones, American singer-songwriter (b. 1928)
2003 – Avni Arbaş, Turkish painter (b. 1919)
  2003   – Stu Hart, Canadian wrestler and trainer (b. 1915)
  2003   – László Papp, Hungarian boxer (b. 1926)
2004 – Pierre Salinger, American journalist and politician, 11th White House Press Secretary (b. 1925)
2006 – John Victor Murra, Ukrainian-American anthropologist and academic (b. 1916)
  2006   – Valentín Paniagua, Peruvian lawyer and politician, 91st President of Peru (b. 1936)
2007 – Deborah Kerr, Scottish actress (b. 1921)
  2007   – Toše Proeski, Macedonian singer-songwriter (b. 1981)
2008 – Dagmar Normet, Estonian author and translator (b. 1921)
2010 – Eyedea, American rapper and producer (b. 1981)
  2010   – Barbara Billingsley, American actress (b. 1915) 
2011 – Dan Wheldon, English race car driver (b. 1978)
2012 – Frank Moore Cross, American scholar and academic (b. 1921)
  2012   – John A. Durkin, American lawyer and politician (b. 1936)
  2012   – Mario Gallegos, Jr., American firefighter and politician (b. 1950)
  2012   – Bódog Török, Hungarian handball player and coach (b. 1923)
  2012   – Eddie Yost, American baseball player and coach (b. 1926)
2013 – Govind Purushottam Deshpande, Indian playwright and academic (b. 1938)
  2013   – George Hourmouziadis, Greek archaeologist and academic (b. 1932)
  2013   – Ed Lauter, American actor (b. 1938)
  2013   – Laurel Martyn, Australian ballerina and choreographer (b. 1916)
  2013   – Robert B. Rheault, American colonel (b. 1925)
  2013   – Saggy Tahir, Pakistani-American lawyer and politician (b. 1944)
2014 – Ioannis Charalambopoulos, Greek colonel and politician, Deputy Prime Minister of Greece (b. 1919)
  2014   – Allen Forte, American musicologist and theorist (b. 1926)
  2014   – Seppo Kuusela, Finnish basketball player and coach (b. 1934)
  2014   – John Spencer-Churchill, 11th Duke of Marlborough, English businessman (b. 1926)
2015 – Richard J. Cardamone, American lawyer and judge (b. 1925)
  2015   – James W. Fowler, American psychologist and academic (b. 1940)
  2015   – William James, Australian general and physician (b. 1930)
  2015   – Vera Williams, American author and illustrator (b. 1927)
  2015   – Memduh Ün, Turkish film producer, director, actor and screenwriter (b. 1920)
2016 – Calvin Carl "Kelly" Gotlieb, Canadian professor and computer scientist (b. 1921)
2017 – Daphne Caruana Galizia, Maltese journalist and blogger (b. 1964)
  2017   – Roy Dotrice, British actor (b. 1923)
  2017   – John Dunsworth, Canadian actor (b. 1946)
  2017   – Sean Hughes, British-born Irish stand-up comedian (b. 1965)

Holidays and observances
 Air Force Day (Bulgaria)
 Boss's Day (United States)
 Christian feast day:
 Balderic (Baudry) of Monfaucon
 Bercharius
 Bertrand of Comminges
 Colmán of Kilroot (Colman mac Cathbaid)
 Eliphius
 Fortunatus of Casei
 Gall
 Gerard Majella
 Hedwig of Silesia
 Hugh Latimer (Anglicanism) 
 Junian (of Saint-Junien)
 Marguerite Marie Alacoque
 Marie-Marguerite d'Youville
 Nicholas Ridley (Anglicanism)
 Silvanus of Ahun
 Blessed Thevarparampil Kunjachan (Syro-Malabar Catholic Church / Catholic Church)
 Pope Victor III
 October 16 (Eastern Orthodox liturgics)
 Pope John Paul II Day (Poland)
 Death anniversary of Liaquat Ali Khan (Pakistan)
 Teachers' Day (Chile)
 World Food Day (International)
 Bu-Ma Democratic Protests Commemoration Day (South Korea)

References

External links

 
 
 

Days of the year
October